Stéphane Houdet and Shingo Kunieda defeated Frédéric Cattaneo and Ronald Vink in the final, 6–4, 6–2 to win the gentlemen's doubles wheelchair tennis title at the 2013 Wimbledon Championships.

Tom Egberink and Michaël Jérémiasz were the defending champions, but were defeated by Cattaneo and Vink in the semifinals.

Seeds

  Stéphane Houdet /  Shingo Kunieda (champions)
  Frédéric Cattaneo /  Ronald Vink (final)

Draw

Finals

References
 Draw

Men's Wheelchair Doubles
Wimbledon Championship by year – Wheelchair men's doubles